Joseph Nalliah Arumugam  (born 23 February 1896) was a leading Ceylon Tamil civil servant.

Early life
Arumugam was born on 23 February 1896. He was from Katkovalam near Point Pedro in northern Ceylon. He was educated at Jaffna Central College. He then studied science at Ceylon Technical College. After passing the inter science examination he went to the UK on a scholarship. There, in December 1921, he joined the Ceylon Civil Service.

Arumugam married a daughter of Muttucumaru and, following her death, Lilly Chelliah.

Career
Arumugam held several civil service positions in Ceylon and was a leading magistrate in Colombo. He became Petrol Controller in 1941 and Commissioner of Motor Transport in 1946. He was later Permanent Secretary at the Ministry of Transport and Works.

In the 1951 New Year Honours Arumugam was made a Commander of the Order of the British Empire.

Death
Arumugam died in the 1960s after retirement.

Joseph Nalliah Arumugam Memorial Award
In 1986 Arumugam's widow established an endowment to award scholarships for science students at the University of Colombo.

References

1896 births
Alumni of Ceylon Technical College
Alumni of Jaffna Central College
Ceylonese Commanders of the Order of the British Empire
People from Northern Province, Sri Lanka
People from British Ceylon
Permanent secretaries of Sri Lanka
Sri Lankan Tamil civil servants
Year of death missing